
Gmina Jeleśnia is a rural gmina (administrative district) in Żywiec County, Silesian Voivodeship, in southern Poland.

Villages
Gmina Jeleśnia contains the villages and settlements of Jeleśnia, Korbielów, Krzyżowa, Krzyżówki, Mutne, Pewel Wielka, Przyborów, Sopotnia Mała and Sopotnia Wielka.

Neighbouring gminas
Gmina Jeleśnia is bordered by the gminas of Koszarawa, Radziechowy-Wieprz, Stryszawa, Świnna, Ujsoły and Węgierska Górka.

References

Jelesnia
Żywiec County